Gnaeus Claudius Severus Arabianus (113 – after 176) was a senator and philosopher who lived in the Roman Empire.

Life
Severus was the son of the consul and first Roman Governor of Arabia Petraea, Gaius Claudius Severus, by an unnamed mother. Severus was of Pontian Greek descent. He was born and raised in Pompeiopolis, a city in the Roman province of Galatia.

When Severus had come to Rome during the reign of Emperor Hadrian (117-138), he had become a philosophical mentor and a teacher to Roman noble students. Among his students was the future Emperor Marcus Aurelius, with whom he had become friends. 
 
In Rome, Severus assumed a reputation as a man of spirit and as a great philosophical mentor. He was a follower of peripatetic philosophy and later served as an ordinary consul in 146 in the reign of Antoninus Pius (138-161). 

He married an unnamed woman, by whom he had a son called Gnaeus Claudius Severus. Severus was evidently a politician with a deep interest in political philosophy, as evidenced by Marcus Aurelius’ opinion of him in Meditations (1.14n): 
 From Severus: love of family, love of truth, love of justice; to have come by his help to understand Thrasea, Helvidius, Cato, Dio Brutus; to have conceived the idea of a balanced constitution, a commonwealth based on equality and freedom of speech, and of a monarchy which values above all the liberty of the subject; from him, too, a constant and vigorous respect for philosophy; beneficence, unstinting generosity, optimism; his confidence in the affection of his friends, his frankness with those who met with his censure, and open likes and dislikes, so that his friends did not need to guess at his wishes.

Sources
 From Tiberius to the Antonines: a history of the Roman Empire AD 14-192, by Albino Garzetti, 1974
 Marcus Aurelius, by Anthony Richard Birley, Routledge, 2000
 The Cambridge Ancient History: the High Empire, A.D. 70-192, by Alan K. Bowman, Peter Garnsey, Dominic Rathbone Edition: 2 - Item notes: v. 11 - 2000
 Marcus Aurelius - Meditations

113 births
2nd-century Romans
Imperial Roman consuls
Galatia (Roman province)
2nd-century philosophers
Roman-era Peripatetic philosophers
Severus Arabianus
Year of death unknown